St Trinian's 2: The Legend of Fritton's Gold is a 2009 British adventure comedy film directed by Oliver Parker and Barnaby Thompson, both of whom directed the previous film in the series. It is the seventh in a long running series of films based on the works of cartoonist Ronald Searle, and the second film produced since the franchise was rebooted in 2007.

A sequel, St Trinian's 3: Battle of the Sexes, had been in development since 2009, but was never produced.

Plot
One night, the girls of St. Trinian's catch Celia, a member of the eco sect, retrieving an old ring from the school's Fritton Archives. Celia explains that an unknown man telephoned her to retrieve it for him in exchange for £20,000. Seeking to get more, Annabelle Fritton, the new head girl, demands £100,000 from the man when he calls back, only for him to refuse and threaten the girls for their greed. When the school's power is cut, the girls ask their headmistress, Camilla Fritton, about why the ring might be so valuable.

Camilla recognises the ring as one of two created by a pirate ancestor of hers in 1589, which when brought together can lead the way to a buried treasure hidden somewhere in the world. Shortly after learning this, the school is besieged by masked men led by Sir Piers Pomfrey, a man of flawless reputation and a descendant of the man that was robbed by Camilla's pirate ancestor, who steals the ring with the intention of finding the treasure.

Seeking to stop him, the girls search for the second ring and find a clue left by another ancestor who located the first and left it in the archives. After a difficult time deciphering a clue they left, the girls find it to be hidden within a boys' school, leaving a group to infiltrate it in disguise and recover it. Seeking to recover the first, the girls learn that Piers is the leader of a secret society known as AD1, a masculinist brotherhood, and that Camilla's old flame and former head of education, Geoffrey Thwaites, knows about him and the society.

After tracking him down at a pub, Camilla convinces him to help them, whereupon she puts him through a course to help him overcome his need for drink, and assigns him to work undercover at AD1's hideout, with Annabelle calling in the former head girl Kelly, now an M.I.7 agent, to assist in the recovery of the ring. Despite the girls not finding it in the vault, Geoffrey spots it being worn by Piers and manages to steal it from him, returning it back to St. Trinian's.

Finding that the two rings bear longitude and latitude coordinates respectively on them, the girls find that the treasure is buried under the Globe Theatre. After organising a flash mob to keep AD1 from pursuing them, after Piers learns they recovered the first ring, Camilla, Geoffrey, the school's bursar, Annabelle and a small group of the girls make it to the theatre, and while the girls head underneath the building, Camilla and Geoffrey pose as actors they knocked out to avoid raising an alarm.

Although the girls make it to the treasure's location within a secret room, they discover a chest within containing nothing more than a note from Pirate Fritton, who gave up being a pirate to write plays under the name of William Shakespeare, and that the treasure was the final play he wrote intended to reveal that "he" was a woman. Piers, managing to track them down, holds them at gunpoint and steals the play from them, revealing that his ancestors knew this fact and that he had always intended to find the play and destroy it. The girls watch as he flees the scene on his private boat.

Seeking to stop him, the girls take control of the reconstruction of the Golden Hind and sail it down the Thames, whereupon they attack Pier's boat, with Camilla recovering the play's script from him. The girls soon return to St. Trinian's for a wild party to celebrate their success, while Piers is exposed for being a sexist after AD1 is revealed to the media.

Cast

 Rupert Everett as Camilla / Captain Fritton / Fortnum Fritton
 Colin Firth as Geoffrey Thwaites
 David Tennant as Pomfrey
 Talulah Riley as Annabelle
 Jodie Whittaker as Beverly
 Juno Temple as Celia
 Tamsin Egerton as Chelsea
 Toby Jones as Bursar
 Sarah Harding as Roxy
 Zawe Ashton as Bianca
 Montserrat Lombard as Zoe
 Ella Smith as Lucy
 Celia Imrie as Matron
 Clara Paget as Bella
 Gabriella Wilde as Saffy
 Cloe Mackie & Holly Mackie as Tania & Tara
 The Banned of St Trinians [Jessica Agombar, Harriet Bamford, Jessica Bell, Daisy Tonge]
 Christian Brassington as Peters
 Oscar as Heathcliff

 Gemma Arterton as Kelly

 Tom Riley as Romeo
 Georgia King as Juliet
 Katherine Parkinson as Physics Teacher
 Pip Torrens as Heathcote Parker
 Steve Furst as Arbuthnott
 Ricky Wilson as Rockstar

Production
Principal photography started in July 2009, at Ealing Studios and on location in various places in London, including the Globe Theatre and on (and in) the River Thames. The 'Old Boys School' was filmed at Charterhouse School in Godalming, Surrey and the boys choir was the Guildford Cathedral Choir. On 16 August 2009, hundreds of extras, along with the main characters, filmed a mass dance scene in the style of a flash mob at London's Liverpool Street Station.

The manor house used as the girls school is Knebworth House in Hertfordshire.

Release
It was announced at the 2008 Cannes Film Festival that St Trinian's 2: The Legend of Fritton's Gold was to be released on 18 December 2009.

Box office
It opened at #2 in the United Kingdom, just behind James Cameron's 3D sci fi epic Avatar, with debut week end box office figures of £1,586,832. As of 10 February 2010, the film has grossed a total of £7,019,714 in the United Kingdom, considerably lower than the first instalment's £12,280,529. It became the fourth biggest film of the Christmas season of 2009: ahead were Alvin and the Chipmunks: The Squeakquel, Guy Ritchie's Sherlock Holmes, and Avatar.

Critical reception
The film received overwhelmingly negative reviews. It holds a 14% 'rotten' rating on Rotten Tomatoes based on 21 reviews, with an average score of 3.55/10.

Home media
The region 2 DVD of the film was released on 24 May 2010. A region 1 DVD release occurred on 23 March 2011.

Proposed sequel
In December 2009, it was announced that there would be a St Trinian's 3: Battle of the Sexes. There was a competition held in 2010 for a girl to win a walk-on role in the film, though the film never went into production.

References

External links
 
 
 
 
 sttrinians Net
 St Trinian's Gallery Movie and Character pictures

2009 films
2000s adventure comedy films
2000s high school films
2009 independent films
2000s teen comedy films
British adventure comedy films
British sequel films
British teen comedy films
British independent films
Cross-dressing in film
2000s English-language films
Films directed by Oliver Parker
Films set in England
Films set in London
Films shot in Hertfordshire
Films shot in London
Films shot in Surrey
St Trinian's films
Treasure hunt films
2009 comedy films
2000s British films